The 2022 Liga 3 West Java is a fifth season of Liga 3 West Java. This league is meant as a qualifying round for the national round of the 2022–23 Liga 3.

Persikab is the defending Champion after winning it in the  2021 season.

Teams

Series 1

Series 2

Venues

Series 1 
Patriot Stadium, Bekasi
Wibawa Mukti Stadium, Bekasi Regency
Singaperbangsa Stadium, Karawang Regency
Purnawarman Stadium, Purwakarta Regency

Series 2 
Bima Stadium, Cirebon
Tegal Gubug Rocket Field, Cirebon Regency
Dayak Cipeujeuh Wetan Field, Cirebon Regency
Mashud Wisnusaputra Stadium, Kuningan Regency

Series 1

First round

Group A

Group B

Group C

Group D

Second round

Group E

Group F

Ranking of third-placed teams

Knockout stage

Series 2

First round

Group A

Group B

Group C

Group D

Group E

Group F

Group G

Group H

Knockout stage

Awards

References 

Liga 3
Sport in West Java
Liga 3 (Indonesia) seasons